Zlatko Liščević (born 8 March 1991) is a Serbian footballer, who plays for Trayal Kruševac.

Personal life
He is a younger brother of Kristina Liščević.

References

External links
 
 Zlatko Liščević stats at utakmica.rs

1991 births
Living people
Sportspeople from Sombor
Croats of Vojvodina
Association football midfielders
Serbian footballers
FK Kolubara players
FK Metalac Gornji Milanovac players
OFK Beograd players
FK Radnik Surdulica players
FK Radnički Pirot players
FK Trayal Kruševac players
Serbian First League players
Serbian SuperLiga players
Serbian expatriate footballers
Serbian expatriate sportspeople in the Czech Republic
Expatriate footballers in the Czech Republic
1. FK Příbram players